The Superliga 2 de Voleibol Masculina (SM-2), is the second category league of Spanish Volleyball, under the Superliga de Voleibol Masculina. The administration of the league is carried out by the Real Federación Española de Voleibol.

Champions by year

See also
 Superliga de Voleibol Masculina
 Superliga Femenina de Voleibol
 Superliga 2 Femenina de Voleibol

External links 
Superliga Masculina 2
Winners by year

Spain men2
2ªMale
Professional sports leagues in Spain